Deoxyuridine (dU) is a compound and a nucleoside.It belongs to a class of compounds known as Pyrimidine 2'-deoxyribonucleosides and closely resembles the chemical composition of uridine but without the presence of the 2' hydroxyl group. Idoxuridine and Trifluridine are variants of deoxyuridine used as antiviral drugs. They are similar enough to be incorporated as part of DNA replication, but they possess side groups on the uracil component (an iodine and a CF3 group, respectively), that prevent base pairing. A known use of dU is as a precursor in the synthesis of Edoxudine.

This compound exists in all living organisms and can become part of DNA in both prokaryotic and eukaryotic cells through two mechanisms. The first is the removal of an amino group from cytosine to result in uracil and the second is the non-intentional incorporation of pyrimidine where thymine belongs in the DNA, resulting in dUMP. 

UMP synthase deficiency is a metabolic disorder in humans that involves deoxyuridine. Deoxyuridine can be toxic. It has also been found in several foods, which makes it a useful indicator for diseases through consumption of those foods.

References 

Nucleosides
Pyrimidinediones